Orbia (previously Mexichem) is a company providing specialty products and methodologies in the agriculture, building and infrastructure, fluorinated solutions, polymer solutions, and data communications sectors. It was founded in 1953 and has headquarters in Mexico City.

History
In 1953 – Cables Mexicanos S.A. was founded by a group of Mexican and American investors, to sell high-carbon steel wire ropes in Mexico. 
In the 60s Cables Mexicanos S.A. changed its name to Aceros Camesa. 
In 1978 – A control company was created "Grupo Industrial Camesa". It became a publicly-held company, listed on Mexican Stock Exchange. 
1997 – Grupo Empresarial Privado Mexicano (GEPM), a company held by the del Valle Family, acquired Grupo Industrial Camesa.

Globalization, 2006–2013
2011 – Mexichem acquired Alphagary Group, a producer of PVC, TPE, and TPO compounds in the United States and the United Kingdom.
2012 – Mexichem acquires Wavin, a European supplier of plastic pipes, expanding Mexichem's water management portfolio with acquired operations in 22 European countries.

Recent history, 2014–2018 
2017 – Mexichem acquired an 80% stake in Netafim, a precision irrigation approaches provider. This expanded the company's reach into the Middle East, Africa, and Asia.

Change of name

Mexichem was rebranded in 2019 as Orbia, from the Latin word for a sphere and Bia, an ancient Greek personification of the concept of "force."

References

External links
 
 

Technology companies of Mexico
Chemical companies of Mexico
Companies listed on the Mexican Stock Exchange
Mexican brands
Mexican companies established in 1953
Companies based in Mexico City